The Food Programme is a BBC Radio 4 programme investigating and celebrating good food, founded by Derek Cooper and currently presented by Sheila Dillon, Dan Saladino, Leyla Kazim and Jaega Wise. The series is produced by BBC Audio in Bristol.

It is a programme about food production, consumption and quality rather than a cookery programme with recipes. It looks at the food industry (usually that of Britain) at the macroscopic level. Farming Today covers the upstream section of the British food industry and The Food Programme covers the downstream section.

History
The programme has run since 1979 and was initially broadcast at 12:30 on a Sunday afternoon, immediately preceding The World This Weekend. It is repeated the following day (i.e. on Monday afternoon) at 3:30 p.m.

In November 2019 The Food Programme celebrated its 40th anniversary. A live show was broadcast from the BBC Radio Theatre with guests Rick Stein, Leyla Kazim, Yotam Ottolenghi and Grace Dent.

Structure
Programmes are usually devoted to discussion of a single topic, from a consumer angle, such as:
 Topical issues related to food, such as institutional cookery or dealing with food waste;
 A specific food item, such as a particular fruit or traditional dish;
 Food of a certain geographical area or of certain ethnic peoples;
 Health issues in relation to food.

Sometimes, the theme of a programme may fit into several of the above categories. For example, the programme broadcast on 14 and 15 August 2011 dealt with institutional policies to improve the diets of people in Scotland so as to make their diets more salubrious, a topic which is at once a topical issue related to food, a health issue related to food and a topic relating to the diet of people in a certain geographical group.

All the most recent programmes are now available indefinitely at the Radio 4 website to listen again.

BBC Food and Farming Awards
The show hosts the annual BBC Radio Food and Farming Awards, and in so doing has been praised by Charles, Prince of Wales as a "national institution".

2009
Bob Kennard won "Best Campaigner".

2019
 Best Streetfood/Takeaway, Liberty Kitchen

Awards won by The Food Programme
The Food Programme, which celebrated its thirtieth anniversary in November 2009, has won multiple UK radio awards.

See also
 You and Yours, covers the more popular (mass market) types of food stories and food scares.

References

External links 

 BBC Radio 4 Food Programme homepage
 Programme topic list 2004-2007

News items
 1999 Interview with former presenter Derek Cooper
 Derek Cooper on the programme's 20th Anniversary

BBC Radio 4 programmes
1979 radio programme debuts
Radio programs about food and drink